Best Friends Animal Society, (BFAS) founded in its present form in 1993, is an American nonprofit 501(c)(3) animal welfare organization. BFAS does outreach nationwide with shelters, rescue groups and members to promote pet adoption, no-kill animal rescue, and spay-and-neuter practices. Best Friends has a 3-star 'Give With Confidence' rating from Charity Navigator.

History
The group originated in England in 1966 as the Process Church of the Final Judgment, co-founded by Mary Ann MacLean, who was married to former church member and Best Friends Animal Society co-founder Gabriel Depeyer, and who lived on Best Friends' sanctuary grounds until her 2005 death.
 
The Foundation church relocated animals from its Arizona ranch to property in Kanab, Utah, in 1984. In 1991, the church was renamed Best Friends Animal Sanctuary, which became a tax-exempt, nonprofit charity, and in 2003, renamed Best Friends Animal Society.

In 2019, Best Friends Animal Society and Southern Utah University began a partnership that included a new certificate program at SUU that included coursework on how to set up and run a no-kill animal shelter.

In 2020, NASCAR driver Alex Bowman added a Best Friends Animal Society paint scheme to his stock car to raise support for animal rescue. Ally Financial and Bowman pledged to make a total of $30,000 in donations to Best Friend affiliated shelters in race host cities during the 2021 season.

Utah animal sanctuary
After the Foundation church moved to its current grounds in 1984, the founders eventually informally called it "Best Friends" until 1991 when it began formally operating as Best Friends Animal Sanctuary, a no-kill shelter located in Southwestern Utah in Angel Canyon (formerly Kanab Canyon) near Kanab.

The sanctuary is home to around 1,500 homeless animals.

Every kind of animal has its own area, considered neighborhoods, which includes Bunny House, Dogtown and Cat World among others. Animals that are unable to be placed in permanent homes and wild animals that cannot be released back into the wild can live out their lives at the sanctuary.

Los Angeles adoption center
In 2011, the city of Los Angeles contracted Best Friends to operate in its Northeast Valley Shelter facility in Mission Hills, Los Angeles, which the city could no longer afford to run due to budget cuts. Under the contract, BFAS was to provide adoptions for shelter animals it obtained solely from LA Animal Service shelters, and to provide spay and neuter services for the community. The contract prohibited BFAS from obtaining animals from any other sources, such as public intake or transfers from other organizations. Best Friends was the only bidder for the contract to run the shelter that had cost the taxpayers $19 million to build just three years prior. There was controversy when other humane organizations discovered the contract, and complained that they had not been notified of the solicitation for bids. , BFAS no longer operate the shelter due to mismanagement.</ref>https://www.citywatchla.com/index.php/cw/animal-watch/25370-no-kill-has-failed-best-friends-leaves-la-city-animal-services-shelter-annenberg-steps-in

Magazine
BFAS publishes Best Friends, a bimonthly magazine about animals, animal welfare, news events, and activities at the sanctuary. The magazine, which is distributed free to members, has 200,000 subscribers. Originating as Foundation magazine in 1975 with its interview of Charles Manson referred to as the "death" issue, the first edition of Best Friends magazine was published in 1993, two years after the religious group became an animal sanctuary.

Hurricane Katrina work
Best Friends teams entered the hurricane disaster area on September 2, 2005, and stayed eight months in and around New Orleans. Best Friends did not have a significant presence doing animal disaster rescue or recovery work until Katrina.

The organization's official role post-Hurricane Katrina was that of a primary animal rescue organization.

Also after Katrina, Best Friends helped Pets Alive, an animal shelter in New York state, and rescued around 800 cats from an institutional hoarding situation in Nevada. Best Friends also assisted local animal rescue groups following the Peruvian earthquakes of 2007.

Michael Vick dogs
In 2007, after petitioning the state of Virginia to save the dogs seized from the Bad Newz Kennels dog fighting investigation, Best Friends took in 22 of the 47 fighting dogs of former NFL quarterback Michael Vick. The dogs were expected to be euthanized for fear of aggressive behavior. Seven other organizations took in the remaining 25 dogs. The court ordered Vick to pay $928,073 in restitution for the “past, present and long-term care of all the dogs.” The court allocated $5,000 for dogs deemed likely to be adopted, and $18,275 for each of the dogs that went into longer-term or lifetime sanctuary care at Best Friends.

In December 2008, Georgia, a former Vick dog, appeared on The Ellen DeGeneres Show with Best Friends dog trainer John Garcia. The two also appeared on CNN's Larry King Live.

Rehabilitation of the Vick dogs appeared in an episode of National Geographic Channel's series DogTown. DogTowns producer, Darcy Dennett, later approached Best Friends about a feature-length documentary on the same story.

Released in October 2015, The Champions is a documentary that covers the stories of five dogs and their impact they had had on their adopters and how society looks at pit bulls rescued from fighting cases. The film received the 2015 Zelda Penzel "Giving Voice to the Voiceless" award at Hamptons International Film Festival. The film also features the work of both Best Friends Animal Society and BAD RAP, an Oakland-based animal welfare rescue group. FilmRise acquired film rights in November 2015. It was released through community screenings and became available digitally in March 2016.

Community cat programs
In August 2008, Best Friends and PetSmart Charities funded a program called "Feral Freedom" for free-roaming community cats in Jacksonville, Florida. The program was conceived by Rick Ducharme of First Coast No More Homeless Pets.

Similar programs were funded with a grant from PetSmart Charities and implemented by Best Friends in Albuquerque, New Mexico; DeKalb County, Georgia; San Antonio, Texas; Baltimore, Maryland; Osceola County, Florida; Philadelphia, Pennsylvania; and other communities. In St. George, Utah, the city partnered with Best Friends on a trap-neuter-return program in January 2013.

See also
List of animal rights groups

References

Further reading

External links
 

1984 establishments in the United States
1991 establishments in Utah
Abuse
Abuse of the legal system
Animal charities based in the United States
Animal shelters in the United States
Charities based in Utah
New religious movements
No kill shelters
Religious organizations established in 1971
Organizations established in 1991
Trap–neuter–return organizations